Bradley Keith Boyes (born April 17, 1982) is a Canadian former professional ice hockey player, who spent thirteen seasons in the National Hockey League (NHL) as a member of seven different teams.

Early life
Boyes went to Hazel McCallion Senior Public School and Clarkson Secondary School, both in Mississauga, before moving to Erie, Pennsylvania. His mother is a teacher. His father is a school principal, and was the principal of Champlain Trail Public School. His father is also one of the directors of the Streetsville Hockey League, a small house league based in Streetsville.

Despite living in the Greater Toronto Area, Boyes was an Ottawa Senators fan growing up. However, the hometown Toronto Maple Leafs were Boyes' "second team", and he would later say that he "always wanted to play for the Leafs".

Playing career
As a youth, Boyes played in the 1996 Quebec International Pee-Wee Hockey Tournament with the Toronto Young Nationals minor ice hockey team. Boyes played several years of roller hockey for the Mississauga Rattlers. He was a member of the Mississauga Reps AAA hockey team before being drafted by the Erie Otters of the Ontario Hockey League (OHL). Boyes won the J. Ross Robertson Cup with the Otters in 2002. In four years with the Otters he registered 141 goals and 309 points in 233 games. He was the OHL's Most Outstanding Player in the 2000–01 season and was twice named the league's most sportsmanlike.

Boyes was drafted by the Toronto Maple Leafs in the first round, 24th overall in the 2000 NHL Entry Draft. He joined the Maple Leafs American Hockey League (AHL) affiliate, the St. John's Maple Leafs, for the 2001–02 season, playing in 65 games. On March 9, 2002 He was traded to the San Jose Sharks along with Alyn McCauley and a 1st round selection in the 2003 NHL Entry Draft in exchange for Owen Nolan. Boyes was assigned to the Sharks' AHL affiliate, the Cleveland Barons. The next season he spent mostly with Cleveland until he was recalled and played in his first NHL game on March 7. Two days later Boyes was traded from the Sharks to the Boston Bruins in a three-way deal that saw Jeff Jillson go to Buffalo Sabres, Curtis Brown go to San Jose, and Brad Boyes and Andy Delmore go to Boston on March 9, 2004.

Boyes was once again assigned to the AHL for the 2004–05 season, this time to the Bruins' affiliate, the Providence Bruins, where he scored 33 goals and 75 points for second on the team and added 8 goals and 15 points in 16 playoff games. He re-signed with Boston in the off-season. Boyes made the Bruins out of training camp for the 2005–06 season and scored his first NHL goal on October 8, 2005, against Sébastien Caron of the Pittsburgh Penguins. He scored his first NHL hat trick on March 18, 2006, against Cam Ward of the Carolina Hurricanes. He finished the season with 26 goals and 69 points in 82 games and was named to the NHL All-Rookie Team. Boyes signed a two-year contract extension in the off-season. The following season Boyes struggled, scoring only 13 goals and 34 points in 62 games. On trade deadline day, the Bruins traded Boyes to the St. Louis Blues in exchange for Dennis Wideman on February 27, 2007.

After arriving in St. Louis, Boyes would score 4 more goals in 19 games. In St. Louis Boyes became a star player, scoring 43 goals in the 2007–08 season. On March 1, 2008, he signed a four-year contract with St. Louis. He followed this up with 33 goals in the 2008–09 season. The following two seasons were disappointment, scoring just 14 goals and 12 goals. On February 27, 2011, Boyes was traded by the Blues to the Buffalo Sabres in exchange for a second round pick in the 2011 NHL Entry Draft. Boyes scored a goal in his Sabres debut on March 2, 2011. He scored again in the following game. In his second season with Buffalo Boyes registered 8 goals and 23 points. During his final season with the Sabres, Boyes became the 20th player in NHL history to play in 500 consecutive games. By the end of his tenure with the Sabres, he was a healthy scratch from the lineup and alternated between centre and winger, failing to get comfortable when in the lineup.

On July 1, 2012, Boyes signed as a free agent to a one-year, $1 million deal with the New York Islanders. With ambition to move on from a disappointing tenure with the Sabres, Boyes rediscovered his scoring touch during the shortened 2012–13 season to score 35 points in 48 games on the Islanders top scoring line alongside John Tavares and Matt Moulson.

Unsigned in the offseason, Boyes was offered a professional try-out contract by the Islanders and the Florida Panthers. He chose to attend the Panthers training camp and signed a one-year deal with them on September 28, 2013. After recording 36 points in 78 games, Boyes was resigned by the Panthers to a two-year, $5.25 million contract.

The last year of Boyes' contract was bought out on June 30, 2015, effectively making Boyes a free agent. Despite picking up 38 points in 78 games and having good advanced analytics, Boyes was unable to find a deal, and on September 10, 2015, he signed a professional tryout contract to attend training camp with the Toronto Maple Leafs, the team who originally drafted him in 2000. Boyes impressed at camp and during the pre-season, and on September 27, 2015, he was rewarded with a 1-year, $700,000 contract from the Leafs. On November 2, 2015, Boyes scored his first goal with the club. In the process, Boyes set a franchise record for longest span between getting drafted and scoring his first goal with the Maple Leafs, notching it 5,609 days after being drafted. Boyes would finish the season with 24 points in 60 games. Boyes once again became an unrestricted free agent at the end of the season.

Career statistics

Regular season and playoffs

International

Awards and honours
1997: Canadian inline hockey Champion - Gold medalist
1998: NARCh North American Roller Hockey Championships - Gold medalist
1999–2000:  Lindsay Cup Trophy
1999–2000: CHL Scholastic Player of the Year
1999–2000: OHL Bobby Smith Trophy (Scholastic Player of the Year)
2000–01: OHL Red Tilson Trophy (Most Outstanding Player)
2000–01: OHL William Hanley Trophy (Most Gentlemanly Player)
2000–01: OHL Second All-Star Team
2001–02: CHL Sportsman of the Year
2001–02: CHL Second All-Star Team
2001–02: OHL First All-Star Team
2001–02: OHL Red Tilson Trophy
2001–02: OHL William Hanley Trophy
2001–02: OHL Wayne Gretzky 99 Award (Playoff MVP)
2002–03: AHL All-Rookie Team
2003–04: AHL Second All-Star Team
2005–06: NHL All-Rookie Team

References

External links
 

1982 births
Living people
Boston Bruins players
Buffalo Sabres players
Canadian ice hockey centres
Cleveland Barons (2001–2006) players
Erie Otters players
Florida Panthers players
Sportspeople from Mississauga
National Hockey League first-round draft picks
New York Islanders players
Providence Bruins players
St. John's Maple Leafs players
St. Louis Blues players
San Jose Sharks players
Toronto Maple Leafs draft picks
Toronto Maple Leafs players
Ice hockey people from Ontario